Kyzyl Airport  serves Kyzyl, the capital of the Tyva Republic (Tuva) in the Russian Federation. The airport is located 6 km southwest of the city center.

The base is home the 32nd Independent Composite Transport Aviation Regiment, Composite Aviation Squadron which is part of the 14th Air and Air Defence Forces Army.

History
The government of Russia plans to renovate the airport, either by itself or in partnership with another agency. A runway extension is planned, so the airport may accept larger aircraft flying to and from Moscow and Saint Petersburg; or for technical stops for flights from China, Mongolia, Kazakhstan and other Asian countries operating to the western part of Russia or elsewhere in Europe. The runway reconstruction officially ended on 13 February 2018, with ATR 42-500 of NordStar arriving from Krasnoyarsk-Yemelyanovo. Currently, the airport plans to become international in 2018, to commence various flights to PRC (Beijing and Ürümqi) and Mongolia (Ulaanbaatar).

On 5 September 2019, Kyzyl Airport received the allowance for international flights.

Airlines and destinations

Statistics

Annual Traffic
Annual Passenger Traffic

Ground transportation
Bus routes #1 and #1A go to the city.

References

External links
 Tuva Airlines official website

Airports in Tuva
Airports built in the Soviet Union
Airport
14th Air and Air Defence Forces Army
Russian Air Force bases